Pervomaysky (masculine), Pervomayskaya (feminine), or Pervomayskoye (neuter) is the name of several inhabited localities in Russia. The names are the adjectives derived from "" (Pervoye Maya), Russian for May 1 (the International Workers' Day).

Urban localities
Pervomaysky, Korkinsky District, Chelyabinsk Oblast, a work settlement in Korkinsky District of Chelyabinsk Oblast
Pervomaysky (urban-type settlement), Kirov Oblast, a closed urban-type settlement in Kirov Oblast
Pervomaysky, Gorodetsky District, Nizhny Novgorod Oblast, a work settlement in Gorodetsky District of Nizhny Novgorod Oblast
Pervomaysky, Pervomaysky District, Tambov Oblast, a work settlement in Pervomaysky District of Tambov Oblast
Pervomaysky, Tula Oblast, a work settlement in Shchyokinsky District of Tula Oblast
Pervomaysky, Zabaykalsky Krai, an urban-type settlement in Shilkinsky District of Zabaykalsky Krai

Rural localities
Pervomaysky, Giaginsky District, Republic of Adygea, a khutor in Giaginsky District of the Republic of Adygea
Pervomaysky, Maykopsky District, Republic of Adygea, a settlement in Maykopsky District of the Republic of Adygea
Pervomaysky, Agapovsky District, Chelyabinsk Oblast, a settlement in Agapovsky District of Chelyabinsk Oblast
Pervomaysky, Ashinsky District, Chelyabinsk Oblast, a settlement in Ashinsky District of Chelyabinsk Oblast
Pervomaysky, Nyazepetrovsky District, Chelyabinsk Oblast, a settlement in Nyazepetrovsky District of Chelyabinsk Oblast
Pervomaysky (rural locality), Kirov Oblast, a settlement in Falyonsky District of Kirov Oblast
Pervomaysky, Gaginsky District, Nizhny Novgorod Oblast, a settlement in Gaginsky District of Nizhny Novgorod Oblast
Pervomaysky, Kulebaksky District, Nizhny Novgorod Oblast, a settlement in Kulebaksky District of Nizhny Novgorod Oblast
Pervomaysky, Abdulinsky District, Orenburg Oblast, a settlement in Pervomaysky Selsoviet of Abdulinsky District
Pervomaysky, Orenburgsky District, Orenburg Oblast, a settlement (formerly an urban-type settlemement) in Pervomaysky Settlement Council of Orenburgsky District (:ru:Первомайский (Оренбургский район))
Pervomaysky, Pervomaysky District, Orenburg Oblast, a settlement in Pervomaysky Selsoviet of Pervomaysky District
Pervomaysky, Svetlinsky District, Orenburg Oblast, a settlement in Sputnikovsky Selsoviet of Svetlinsky District
Pervomaysky, Bondarsky District, Tambov Oblast, a settlement in Bondarsky District of Tambov Oblast
Pervomaysky, Inzhavinsky District, Tambov Oblast, a settlement in Inzhavinsky District of Tambov Oblast
Pervomaysky, Nikiforovsky District, Tambov Oblast, a settlement in Nikiforovsky District of Tambov Oblast
Pervomaysky, Bolshelomovissky Selsoviet, Pichayevsky District, Tambov Oblast, a settlement in Bolshelomovissky Selsoviet of Pichayevsky District of Tambov Oblast
Pervomaysky, Lipovsky Selsoviet, Pichayevsky District, Tambov Oblast, a settlement in Lipovsky Selsoviet of Pichayevsky District of Tambov Oblast
Pervomaysky, Rzhaksinsky District, Tambov Oblast, a settlement in Rzhaksinsky District of Tambov Oblast
Pervomaysky, Tambovsky District, Tambov Oblast, a settlement in Tambovsky District of Tambov Oblast
Pervomaysky, name of several other rural localities
Pervomayskaya, Kirov Oblast, a village in Svechinsky District of Kirov Oblast
Pervomayskaya, Kurgan Oblast, a village in Petukhovsky District of Kurgan Oblast
Pervomayskaya, name of several other rural localities
Pervomayskoye, Amur Oblast, a selo in Tyndinsky District of Amur Oblast
Pervomayskoye, Leningrad Oblast, a logging depot settlement in Vyborgsky District of Leningrad Oblast
Pervomayskoye, Orenburg Oblast, a selo in Pervomaysky Selsoviet of Sol-Iletsky District
Pervomayskoye, Tomsk Oblast, a selo in Pervomaysky District of Tomsk Oblast
Pervomayskoye, name of several other rural localities

Historical names
Pervomaysky, name of the town of Novodvinsk before 1977

Historical localities
Pervomaysky, a former urban-type settlement in Kirov Oblast; since 2005—a part of the town of Slobodskoy
Pervomaysky, a former urban-type settlement in Moscow Oblast; since 2003—a part of the city of Korolyov

References